Lieutenant General Fedor Ivanovich Shcherbakov (26 May 1947 – 16 August 2022) was a Kazakh military officer of Russian descent, who served as the first Commander-in-Chief of the Kazakh Ground Forces.

Biography 
He was born 26 May 1947 in the village of Bïdayık in the Zhanaarka District of the Karaganda Region. From 1966 to 1970, he studied at the Tashkent Higher All-Arms Command School. After graduating from college, he served as commander of a motorized rifle platoon of the Soviet Army. In the 1970s, he served in the Group of Soviet Forces in East Germany. In 1980, he graduated from the Frunze Military Academy. From 1980 to 1987, he served as commander of a motorized rifle regiment in the Far East. By the dissolution of the Soviet Union, he was commander of the 99th Motorized Rifle Division of the Far Eastern Military District in the Magadan Oblast.

In 1992, Major General Shcherbakov graduated from the Military Academy of the General Staff of the Armed Forces of Russia, after which he continued his military service in the Armed Forces of the Republic of Kazakhstan. During that summer and that fall, he was  the First Deputy Commander of the 40th Kazakh Combined Arms Army. In October 1992, he was appointed to the post of Commander of the 1st Army Corps, headquartered in Semipalatinsk. On 5 May 1993, Shcherbakov he was awarded the military rank of Lieutenant General. He was dismissed from this post in February 1994, being appointed Commander of the Ground Forces and First Deputy Minister of Defense of the Republic of Kazakhstan. He was among the few professional military personnel at independence. Together with Sagadat Nurmagambetov, he developed the first military doctrine of independent Kazakhstan. In November 1997, this post officially was changed to Commander of the General Forces. In 2000, Lieutenant General Shcherbakov was transferred to the reserve at the age of 53. He was previously a top contender for the post of defence minister.

Awards 
He was awarded the Order of the Red Star (USSR, 1989) and the Order of Kurmet (Republic of Kazakhstan, May 1997), as well as many medals of the USSR and the Republic of Kazakhstan.

References 

1947 births
2022 deaths
Kazakhstani generals
Kazakhstani people of Russian descent
People from Karaganda Region
Military Academy of the General Staff of the Armed Forces of the Soviet Union alumni
Frunze Military Academy alumni
Tashkent Higher All-Arms Command School alumni
Recipients of the Order of the Red Star
Recipients of the Order of Kurmet